Metaleptus brasiliensis is a species of beetle in the family Cerambycidae. It was described by Schaufuss in 1871.

References

Trachyderini
Beetles described in 1871